This is a list of composers who are either native to the country of Canada, are citizens of that nation, or have spent a major portion of their careers living and working in Canada. The list is arranged in alphabetical order:

A

John Abram (born 1959)
Murray Adaskin (1906–2002)
Andrew Ager (born 1962)
Kati Agócs (born 1975)
Lucio Agostini (1913–1996)
Robert Aitken (born 1939)
J. E. P. Aldous (1853–1934)
Gaston Allaire (1916–2011)
Émilien Allard (1915–1977)
Joseph Allard (1873–1947)
Peter Allen (born 1952)
Kristi Allik (born 1952)
Paul Ambrose (1868–1941)
Robert Ambrose (1824–1908)
W.H. Anderson (1882–1955)
Samuel Andreyev (born 1981)
Humfrey Anger (1862–1913)
István Anhalt (1919–2012)
Paul Anka (born 1941)
Louis Applebaum (1918–2000)
Violet Archer (1913–2000)
John Arpin (1936–2007)
Raynald Arseneault (1945–1995)

B

Maya Badian (born 1945)
Michael Conway Baker (born 1937)
Gerald Bales (1919–2002)
Steve Barakatt (born 1973)
Lesley Barber (born 1968)
Milton Barnes (1931–2001)
Joseph Beaulieu (1895–1965)
William Beauvais (born 1956)
Christophe Beck (born 1972)
John Beckwith (born 1927)
Léon Bernier (1936–2011) 
Denis Bédard (born 1950)
Norma Beecroft (born 1934)
Jack Behrens (born 1935)
Marc Bélanger (born 1940)
Alan Belkin (born 1951)
Gilles Bellemare (born 1952)
Herbert Belyea (1917–2001)
Boris Berlin (1907–2001)
Conrad Bernier (1904–1988)
Daniel Berthiaume (born 1956)
Lorne Betts (1918–1985)
Amin Bhatia (born 1961)
Jocelyne Binet (1923–1968)
Keith Bissell (1912–1992)
Lloyd Blackman (born 1928)
Patricia Blomfield Holt (1910–2003)
Antoine Bouchard (born 1932)
Linda Bouchard (born 1957)
Victor Bouchard (1926–2011)
Adélard Joseph Boucher (1835–1912)
Lydia Boucher (1890–1971)
Walter Boudreau (born 1947)
Ned Bouhalassa (born 1962)
Denys Bouliane (born 1955)
Pierre Brabant (1925–2014)
Timothy Brady (born 1956)
Henry Brant (1913–2008)
Jean-Chrysostome Brauneis I (1785–1832)
Jean-Chrysostome Brauneis II (1814–1871)
Annie Glen Broder (1857–1937)
Alexander Brott (1915–2005)
Stephen Brown (born 1948)
Edwin Orion Brownell (born 1964)
Walter Buczynski (born 1933)
John Burge (born 1961)
John Burke (1951–2020)

C

Howard Cable (1920–2016)
Christian Calon (born 1950)
Allison Cameron (born 1963)
Nicole Carignan (born 1952)
Bruce Carlson (born 1944)
Albertine Caron-Legris (1906–1972)
Pat Carrabré (born 1958)
Albert Chamberland (1886–1975)
Claude Champagne (1891–1965)
Caleb Chan (born 1988)
Dorothy Chang (born 1970)
Alexander Chuhaldin (1892–1951)
Gustav Ciamaga (born 1930)
Chan Ka Nin (born 1949)
Derek Charke (born 1974)
Benoît Charest (born 1964)
Stephen Chatman  (born 1950)
Brian Cherney  (born 1942)
Neil Chotem (1920–2008)
Dolores Claman (1927–2021)
F. R. C. Clarke (1931–2009)
James P. Clarke (1807/8–1877)
Donald Alexander Cochrane (born 1928)
Bruce Cockburn (born 1945)
Stephen Codman (c. 1796–1852)
Warren Cohen (born 1954)
Leonard Cohen (1934–2016)
Michael Colgrass (1932–2019)
Ron Collier (1930–2003)
Alexis Contant (1858–1918)
Jean Coulthard (1908–2000)
Francois Couture (born 1965)
Guillaume Couture (1851–1915)
Richard Covey (born 1979)
Gabriel Cusson (1903–1972)

D

Jimmy Dale (1935–2017)
Eleanor Joanne Daley (born 1955)
Omar Daniel (born 1960)
Jeff Danna (born 1964)
Mychael Danna (born 1958)
Yves Daoust (born 1946)
Lionel Daunais (1901–1982)
Raymond Daveluy (1926–2016)
Sarah Davachi (born 1987)
Hugh Davidson (born 1930)
Victor Davies (born 1939)
Morris Davis (1904–1968)
Stu Davis (1921–2007)
Gordon Delamont (1918–1981)
Isabelle Delorme (1900–1991)
Allard de Ridder (1887–1966)
Jean Derome (born 1955)
Alfred De Sève (1858–1927)
Jacques Desjardins
Jean Deslauriers (1909–1978)
Robert Nathaniel Dett (1882–1943)
Alan Detweiler (1926–2012)
Keiko Devaux
Zosha Di Castri (born 1985)
Paul Dolden (born 1956)
Samuel Dolin (1917–2002)
Emily Doolittle (born 1972)
Margaret Drynan (1915–1999)
René Dupéré (born 1946)
Kyle Bobby Dunn (born 1986)

E

Colin Eatock (born 1958)
Sophie Carmen Eckhardt-Gramatté (1899–1974)
Anne Eggleston (1934–1994)
Arne Eigenfeldt (born 1962)
Carleton Elliott (1928–2003)
Lisle Ellis (born 1951)
John Estacio (born 1966)
José Evangelista (born 1943)

F
Percy Faith (1908–1976)
Robert Farnon (1917–2005)
Jacques Faubert (born 1952)
Robert Fleming (1921–1976)
Leila Fletcher (1899–1988)
John Fodi (1944–2009)
Alexandra Fol (born 1981)
Clifford Ford (born 1947)
Malcolm Forsyth (1936–2011)
W. O. Forsyth (1859–1937)
Achille Fortier (1864–1939)
David Foster (born 1949)
Joseph-A. Fowler (1845–1917)
Jason Frederick (born 1970)
Harry Freedman (1922–2005)
Susan Frykberg (born 1954)
Darren Fung
Vivian Fung (born 1975)

G

Kim Gaboury aka aKido (born 1976)
Gérald Gagnier (1926–1961)
J.-J. Gagnier (1885–1949)
René Gagnier (1892–1951)
Alain Gagnon (1938-2017)
André Gagnon (1936-2020)
Ernest Gagnon (1834–1915)
Gustave Gagnon (1842–1930)
Henri Gagnon (1887–1961)
Serge Garant (1929–1986)
Mort Garson (1924–2008)
Desmond Gaspar (born 1970)
James Gayfer (1916–1997)
James Gelfand, (born 1959)
Steven Gellman (born 1947)
Eric Genuis (born 1967)
Graham George (1912–1993)
Aaron Gervais (born 1980)
Richard Gibson (born 1953)
Allan Gilliland (born 1965)
Srul Irving Glick (1934–2002)
Denis Gougeon (born 1951)
Maxime Goulet (born 1980)
Glenn Gould (1932–1982)
Hector Gratton (1900–1970)

H

Peter Hannan (born 1953)
Hagood Hardy (1937–1997)
Chris Harman (born 1970)
Johana Harris (1912–1995)
Charles A.E. Harriss (1862–1929)
Christos Hatzis (born 1953)
John Hawkins (1944–2007)
Donald Heins (1878–1949)
Jacques Hétu (1938–2010)
W. H. Hewlett (1873–1940)
Jim Hiscott (born 1948)
Alice Ping Yee Ho (born 1960)
Bruce Holder (1905–1987)
Derek Holman (born 1931)
Anna Höstman (born 1972)
Charles Houdret (1905-after 1964)
Melissa Hui (born 1966)
Richard Hunt (1930–2011)
Ricky Hyslop (1915–1998)

I

Scott Irvine (born 1953)
Airat Ichmouratov (born 1973)

J

Rhené Jaque (1918–2006)
Frantz Jehin-Prume (1839–1899)
Otto Joachim (1910–2010)
Richard Johnston (1917–1997)
Charles Jones (1910–1997)
Kelsey Jones (1922–2004)
Michael Jones (born 1942)

K

James Keelaghan (born 1959)
Jack Kane (1924–1961)
Udo Kasemets (1919–2014)
Iain Kelso (born 1975)
Talivaldis Kenins (1919–2008)
Julien Knafo
Moe Koffman (1928–2001)
Gary Koftinoff
Rudolf Komorous (born 1931)
Peter Paul Koprowski (born 1947)
Nikolai Korndorf (1947–2001)
Mark Korven
Veronika Krausas (born 1963)
David Kristian (born 1967)
Gary Kulesha (born 1954)
Alfred Kunz (1929–2019)
Larysa Kuzmenko (born 1956)
Milan Kymlicka (1936–2008)

L

Larry Lake (1943–2013)
Jean-Baptiste Labelle (1825–1898)
Fariborz Lachini (born 1949)
Alfred La Liberté (1882–1952)
Alcides Lanza (born 1929)
Eugène Lapierre (1899–1970)
Yves Lapierre (born 1946)
Anne Lauber (born 1943)
Louis-Phillipe Laurendeau (1861–1916)
Rachel Laurin (born 1961)
Calixa Lavallée (1842–1891)
Jimmie LeBlanc (born 1977)
Hugh Le Caine (1914–1977)
Brent Lee (born 1964)
Alain Lefèvre (born 1962)
André Éric Létourneau (born 1967)
Omer Létourneau (1891–1983)
Gordon Lightfoot (born 1938)
Nicole Lizée (born 1973)
Analia Llugdar (born 1972)
Andrew Lockington (born 1972)
Ruth Lomon (born 1930)
Michel Longtin (born 1946)
Alexina Louie (born 1949)
Clarence Lucas (1866–1947)
Ramona Luengen (born 1960)
René Lussier (born 1957)

M

Andrew Paul MacDonald (born 1958)
David MacIntyre (born 1952)
Ernest MacMillan (1893–1973)
Walter MacNutt (1910–1996)
Robert Graham Manson (1883–1950)
Leo Marchildon (born 1962)
Frank Marsales (1886–1975)
Charles-Amador Martin (1648–1711)
Lucien Martin (1908–1950)
Stephanie Martin
Gene Martynec (born 1947)
Bruce Mather (born 1939)
André Mathieu (1929–1968)
Rodolphe Mathieu (1890–1962)
Roger Matton (1929–2004)
Michael Matthews (born 1950)
Christopher Mayo (born 1980)
Michael McCann (born 1976)
Boyd McDonald (born 1932)
Diana McIntosh (born 1937)
Allan McIver (1904–1969)
Ben McPeek (1934–1981)
Colin McPhee (1900–1964)
Lubomyr Melnyk (born 1948)
Pierre Mercure (1927–1966)
Alfred Mignault (1895–1961)
Cassandra Miller (born 1976)
Elma Miller (born 1954)
David Mills (1926–2020)
John Mills-Cockell (born 1943)
Kenneth G. Mills (1923–2004)
Robin Minard (born 1953)
Henri Miro (1879–1950)
Joni Mitchell (born 1943)
Stephan Moccio (born 1972)
Theodore Frederic Molt (1795–1856)
James Montgomery (born 1943)
Oskar Morawetz (1917–2007)
François Morel (1926–2018)
Éric Morin (born 1969)
Léo-Pol Morin (1892–1941)
Albertine Morin-Labrecque (1886 or 1890–1957)
Jocelyn Morlock (born 1969)
Marjan Mozetich (born 1948)

N
Phil Nimmons (born 1923)
Jordan Nobles (born 1969)
Robert Normandeau (born 1955)
Farangis Nurulla-Khoja (born 1972)

O
Oscar O'Brien (1892–1958)
Michael Oesterle (born 1968)
John Oliver (born 1959)
Charles O'Neill (1882–1964)
John Oswald (born 1953)

P

Owen Pallett (born 1979)
Jean Papineau-Couture (1916–2000)
Donald Patriquin (born 1938)
Alex Pauk (born 1945)
Trevor W. Payne (born 1948)
Kenneth Peacock (1922–2000)
Paul Pedersen (born 1935)
Frédéric Pelletier (1870–1944)
Romain Pelletier (1875–1953)
Romain-Octave Pelletier I (1843–1927)
Oscar Peterson (1925–2007)
Barbara Pentland (1912–2000)
Clermont Pépin (1926–2006)
Michel Perrault (born 1925)
Jean Piché (born 1951)
Dave Pierce (born 1972)
Randolph Peters (born 1959)
Benoît Poirier (1882–1965)
Paul Pratt (1894–1967)
Albert Pratz (1914–1995)
André Prévost (1934–2001)
Erica Procunier
Harry Puddicombe (1870–1953)

Q

Donald Quan (born 1962)
Joseph Quesnel (1746–1809)

R

Allan Rae (born 1942)
Imant Raminsh (born 1943)
Evelin Ramón (born 1979)
Jan Randall (born 1952)
Eldon Rathburn (1916–2008)
Elizabeth Raum (born 1945)
John Rea (born 1944)
William Reed (1859–1945)
Bill Richards (1923–1995)
Abigail Richardson-Schulte (born 1976)
Godfrey Ridout (1918–1984)
Doug Riley (1945–2007)
André Ristic (born 1972)
Normand Roger (born 1949)
Stan Rogers (1949–1983)
James Rolfe (born 1961)
Ivan Romanoff (1914–1997)
Clark Ross (born 1957)
Myke Roy (born 1950)
Stéphane Roy (born 1959)
Terry Rusling (1931-1974)
Welford Russell (c.1901–1975)
Jeffrey Ryan (born 1962)

S

Marc Sabat (born 1965)
Charles Wugk Sabatier (1819–1862)
Patrick Saint-Denis (born 1975)
Micheline Coulombe Saint-Marcoux (1938–1985)
Herbert Sanders (1878–1938)
Armando Santiago (born 1932)
Vahram Sargsyan (born 1981)
Charles Sauvageau (1807–1849)
R. Murray Schafer (1933-2021)
Oliver Schroer (1956–2008)
Ernest Seitz (1892–1978)
Paul Shaffer (born 1949)
Rodney Sharman (born 1958)
Howard Shore (born 1946)
Bekah Simms (born 1990)
Gordon Slater (born 1950)
Anita Sleeman (1930–2011)
Linda Catlin Smith (born 1957)
Leo Smith (1881–1952)
Ana Sokolovic (born 1968)
Harry Somers (1925–1999)
Ann Southam (1937–2010)
David Squires (born 1957)
Andrew Staniland (born 1977)
Paul Steenhuisen (born 1965)
Ben Steinberg (born 1930)
Donald Steven (born 1945)
Tobin Stokes (born 1966)
Fred Stone (1935–1986)
Timothy Sullivan (born 1954)
Norman Symonds (1920–1998)
Boleslaw Szczeniowski (1898–1995)
Chiyoko Szlavnics (born 1967)

T

Robert Talbot (1893–1954)
Georges-Émile Tanguay (1893–1964)
Nancy Telfer (born 1950)
Oscar Ferdinand Telgmann (1855–1946)
Steve Tittle (born 1935)
Peter Togni (born 1959)
Roman Toi (1916–2018)
Jerry Toth (1928–1999)
Rudy Toth (1925–2009)
Bramwell Tovey (born 1953)
Jiří Traxler (1912–2011)
Amédée Tremblay (1876–1949)
George Tremblay (1911–1982)
Gilles Tremblay (1932–2017)
Barry Truax (born 1947)
Robert Turner (1920–2012)
Ian Tyson (born 1933)

U

Owen Underhill (born 1954)

V

Jean Vallerand (1915–1994)
Randy Vancourt (born 1961)
Stéphane Venne (born 1941)
Benoît Verdickt (1884–1970)
Joseph Vézina (1849–1924)
Albert Viau (1910–2001)
Michael Vincent (composer) (born 1976)
Claude Vivier (1948–1983)
Augustus Stephen Vogt (1861–1926)
Calvin Vollrath (born 1960)

W

Arnold Walter (1902–1973)
Ruth Watson Henderson (born 1932)
Rufus Wainwright (born 1973)
John Weinzweig (1913–2006)
Frank Welsman (1873–1952)
John Welsman (born 1955)
Hildegard Westerkamp (born 1946)
Dinuk Wijeratne (born 1978)
Eric Wild (1910–1989)
Rick Wilkins (born 1937)
Healey Willan (1880–1968)
Charles Wilson (born 1931)
Scott Wilson (born 1969)
Édouard Woolley (1916–1991)
John Wyre (1941–2006)

Y

Kathleen Yearwood  (born 1958)
Gayle Young  (born 1950)
Neil Young (born 1945)

Z

Maurice Zbriger (1896–1981)
Rui Shi Zhuo (born 1956)
Joel Zimmerman (born 1981)
León Zuckert (1904–1992)

See also

Canadian classical music
Music of Canada
Society of Composers, Authors and Music Publishers of Canada

References

Further reading

External links
Canadian Music Centre

 
Canadian
Composers